The Poet Laureate of Illinois is the poet laureate for the U.S. state of Illinois. The state's first three Poets Laureate were named at the initiative of individual governors. In 2003 the title was made into a four-year renewable award.

List of Poets Laureate

See also

 Poet laureate
 List of U.S. states' poets laureate
 United States Poet Laureate

References

 
Illinois culture
American Poets Laureate